Mali Ločnik ( or) is a settlement north of Turjak in the Municipality of Velike Lašče in central Slovenia. The entire Municipality of Velike Lašče is part of the traditional region of Lower Carniola and is now included in the Central Slovenia Statistical Region.

The local church, built on a hill northwest of the village, is dedicated to Saint Agathius and belongs to the Parish of Turjak. It dates to the 15th century.

References

External links
Mali Ločnik on Geopedia

Populated places in the Municipality of Velike Lašče